O'Connell Road is a New South Wales rural road linking Oberon to the regional highway hub of Bathurst, where several roads including Great Western Highway, Mid-Western Highway, Mitchell Highway and Bathurst-Ilford Road join.

Route
It is fully sealed over its entire length and of high enough standard to accommodate B-double trucks.

In conjunction with Goulburn-Oberon Road from Hume Highway to Oberon, this scenic route provides a leisurely and surprisingly direct route between Bathurst and Goulburn. It is designated part of Tourist Route 1.

The only town on O'Connell Road between Bathurst and Oberon is O'Connell.

History
The passing of the Main Roads Act of 1924 through the Parliament of New South Wales provided for the declaration of Main Roads, roads partially funded by the State government through the Main Roads Board (later the Department of Main Roads, and eventually Transport for NSW). Main Road No. 256 was declared along this road on 8 August 1928, from the intersection with Great Western Highway near Bathurst to Oberon (and continuing southwards via Taralga to the intersection with Hume Highway at Goulburn).

The passing of the Roads Act of 1993 updated road classifications and the way they could be declared within New South Wales. Under this act, O'Connell Road today is declared part of Main Road 253, from Bathurst to Oberon (and continuing eastwards via the Jenolan Caves and Hampton to the intersection with Great Western Highway at Hartley.

Major intersections

See also

 Highways in Australia
 List of highways in New South Wales
 Fish River

References

Highways in Australia
Oberon Council